Thomas Paine Plaza is an open space park in Philadelphia, Pennsylvania, named in honor of Thomas Paine.  It is the location of the city's Municipal Services Building across from Dilworth Park and City Hall.  The design, by Sam Durant and Frank Rizzo, consists of a labyrinth of chain linked fences.  The park was redesigned and dedicated by Mayor Michael Nutter in a ribbon cutting ceremony in October 2015.

History
The site, which contains enlarged Monopoly game pieces, gained notoriety in July 2016 when the 2016 Democratic National Convention was held in Philadelphia, as the site of anti Hillary Clinton (pro Bernie Sanders) gatherings, denouncing the democratic nominee as corrupt, in light of the Debbie Wasserman Schultz scandal.  The park was also the camp location of Occupy Philadelphia in 2011.

References

Parks in Philadelphia